The fifth season of La Más Draga premiered on 27 September 2022, available through YouTube, and was produced by La Gran Diabla Producciones. The series featured twelve contestants, from all over American Continent, competing for the title of La Más Draga of Mexico and Latin America and a cash prize of $500,000 MXN Pesos. The winner of the fifth season of La Más Draga was Fifí Estah, with Hidden Mistake, Liza Zan Zuzzi and Paper Cut as runners-up.

The judges panel of this season include Mexican TV personality Maca Carriedo, who was also the main host, hair and makeup artist Yari Mejía, drag performer Bernardo "Letal" Vázquez, and Spanish actress and dancer Raquel Martínez.

Similarly to the fourth season, thirty drag performers from the audition tapes were selected and asked to perform in a Live Audition held in Mexico City. The live auditions were broadcast on 15 and 16 March 2022, with three contestants confirmed to be cast by the judges and public vote (Deseos Fab, Fifí Estah and Liza Zan Zuzzi). While the final contestants, alongside the "Secret Contestants", were announced during the first episode of the show. Season 4 contestant Paper Cut returned to the competition.

Contestants 
Ages, names, and cities stated are at time of filming.

Notes

Contestant progress
Legend:

Scores history

Lip syncs 
Legend:

Notes:

Judges

Main judges 
 Yari Mejía, designer, stylist, singer and model
 Bernardo "Letal" Vázquez, drag queen and professional makeup artist
 Raquel Martínez, actress and dancer

Guest judges 
Listed in chronological order.
 Roberto Carlo, actor, television judge, and host of the fourth season of La Más Draga
 El Escorpión Dorado, internet personality
 Mon Laferte, singer, composer and painter
 Natalia Téllez, internet personality
 Edith Márquez, singer and actress
 Paulina Goto, actress, singer, and television hostess
 María León, actress, singer, and dancer
 Lila Downs, singer-songwriter
 Laura León, actress and singer
 Jhonny Caz, singer and member of regional Mexican band Grupo Firme
 Anahí, singer and actress
 Ricky Lips, drag performer and celebrity impersonator
 Tía Fer, winner of La Más Draga online contest

Special guests
Guests who will appear in episodes, but not judge on the main stage.

Episode 1
Pablo Solano, photographer

Episode 5
Alfonso González, Uber México's representative
Paola Gómez, actress and singer

Episode 6
Alaín Pinzón, activist and VIHve Libre's representative

Episode 7
Jano, Internet personality
Quecho Muñoz, actor, singer, and writer
Yeyonce Maldonado, choreographer

Episode 8
Salma Luévano, politician and LGBT+ activist

Episode 9
Claudia Garibay, Queen Skittles' representative
Gerardo Zaldivar, Comex's representative

Episode 11
 Georgiana, contestant and La Más Querida on season 4

Episode 12
 Diana Deskrados and Luis, PrideMx's representatives
 Paola Gómez, singer and actress
 Rebel Mörk, winner of season 4

Episodes 
<onlyinclude>

References 

Mexican reality television series
Mexican LGBT-related television shows
Drag (clothing) television shows
Reality competition television series
2020s LGBT-related reality television series
2022 in LGBT history